Dominator is a British comic character created by Tony Luke, and since his first appearance in 1988 Luke has been chronicling the ongoing adventures of the eponymous Demon God of Rock & Roll in many different forms. It is known for being the first British CGI movie, and was made on a series of relatively simple programs on an Apple Mac, hence the overly primitive animation and unrefined graphics.

Overview
As of 2006, Dominator is in its fourth incarnation, but the series is currently in hiatus for an unknown amount of time.

It originally appeared in a short-lived run in the music magazine Metal Hammer in 1988, with black and white artwork, and plots that often involved the leading rock stars of the time.

After a hiatus following the end of its original run, Dominator was resurrected in 1993 as the first ever Brit-created manga series printed in "Kodansha Comic Afternoon", still drawn by Luke, and now boasting scripts by Alan Grant.

In 2003 the comic was adapted as an animated film by Luke's Renga Media, and two further short films followed in 2004 and 2005: namely A Brief History of Hell and Heavy Metal vs Dominator, the latter of which was a crossover with characters from the Heavy Metal universe.

As of late 2006, Renga Media revealed Dominator X, which was going to be an entirely new revamp for the series. This bigger-budget remake was going to run as a manga illustrated by Masanori Shino, as well as a downloadable series and film. Dominator X was slated for a release in 2007, and eventually 2008, but it was confirmed that the project was canceled due to financing conflicts. Renga Media has since liquidated, but its staff now work at Renegade Arts Entertainment, established by Tony Luke.

Film story
Lord Desecrater has defeated Lucifer as the ruler of Hell, but Desecrater's general, Dominator, has rebelled and stolen the Key to Hell to prevent Desecrater gaining control of the realm. On Earth, the daughters of an exorcist by the name of Dr. Payne accidentally summon Dominator to Earth by playing the forbidden Lost Chord. Dominator is soon followed by three of Lord Desecrater's soldiers; Decimator, Extricator, and his former lover, Lady Violator. Dominator must prevent Lord Desecrater coming to Earth at all costs, while battling the many demons that are emerging from the hole that has been torn between the two realms.

Concept
Dominator was initially supposed to be a downloadable series made on Apple Macs around 2001 and was going to be based on the events that took place in the manga. The project was put on hold when creator Tony Luke was diagnosed with asbestosis, after making a recovery, the UK Sci-Fi Channel, whom Tony Luke had previously made a launch special for, approached him and asked for Dominator to be turned into a movie. With little time granted, much of the work what was created two years ago had to be salvaged with little revision while voice actors were collected. The film has been released to a largely negative reception due to how it was accidentally labeled anime thanks to the Sci-Fi Channel and because of the UK distributors, Salvation Films. However, it has received positive comments from some and the determination of director Tony Luke, who was reportedly struggling with depression after his bout with cancer and an unforgiving work schedule, has been praised.

See also
 Renga Media

References

Voice cast
 Dominator Dani Filth
 Dr Payne / Lord Desecrater Doug Bradley
 Lady Violator Ingrid Pitt
 Tara Payne Tara Harley
 Fina Payne Liza Goddard
 Molly Payne Sarn Synthetic
 Decimator Marc Riley
 Extricator Mark Radcliffe
 Hellkatt Seera Backhouse
 Bishop Alex Cox
 Prime Minister Doug Devaney
 Shagg / Narrator Robert Rankin
 Lendra Patel Billie Godfrey

External links
Official homepage of Renga Media

Official homepage of Cradle Of Filth
An overview of the entire series

Comics characters introduced in 1988
Original English-language manga
British comics titles
Works by Alan Grant (writer)